Frequent Death (original title: Fréquence meurtre) is a 1988 French crime film directed by Élisabeth Rappeneau. It is based on Stuart M. Kaminsky's 1983 novel When the Dark Man Calls.

Plot 
Jeanne Quester is a single mother. As a certified psychologist, she works two jobs. During daytime she does social work, but at night she is a radio personality who provides live advice for needy callers. Due to the success of her radio show, she receives the offer to work for TV.

Suddenly she is menaced by alienating, enigmatic calls whenever she is on air. Moreover, a stranger manages to secretly access her flat and when Jeanne returns there, she finds her daughter's parrot killed. Later, she discovers somebody has attacked her car. Jeanne turns to her brother Frank, who is a policeman. Frank finds out that the convicted murderer of their parents was released just recently. Jeanne is afraid the murderer is out for vengeance.

Eventually she finds the alleged murderer himself brutally killed in her flat. Even so, the more and more openly threatening calls continue and finally her daughter gets kidnapped by the mysterious caller. Jeanne meets the kidnapper who turns out being the real murderer of her parents. He discloses his identity and tells her what really happened back then. When Jeanne can't comply with his demands, he decides to kill her.

Cast 
Catherine Deneuve as Jeanne Quester
André Dussollier as Frank Quester
Martin Lamotte as Simon Lieberman
Étienne Chicot as Roger 
Inès Claye as Pauline
Madeleine Marie as Ida Faber
Philippe Lehembre as Faber
Daniel Rialet as Fred Bastin
Alain Stern as MacGregor
Martine Chevallier as Marie

References

External links 
 
 
 Frequent Death at Moviefone
  Frequent Death at Uni France  

1988 films
1980s crime thriller films
French crime thriller films
Films with screenplays by Jacques Audiard
1980s French-language films
1980s French films